The emo killings in Iraq were a string of homicides that were part of a campaign against Iraqi teenage boys who dressed in an emo style carried out by terrorists as an attack on Western culture. Between 6 and 70 young men were kidnapped, tortured and murdered in Baghdad and Iraq during March 2012. In September 2012, BBC News reported that gay men in Baghdad said the killings had not abated.

Background 
The emo subculture gained popularity among Iraqi teens in 2011. Earlier, it had become popular in other Arab countries. Emo, an offshoot of alternative rock music, is associated in most of the world with teen fashion and alienation, but in the Arab world is also strongly associated with homosexuality. In 2009, Saudi Arabia's religious police arrested 10 emo women for allegedly causing a disturbance in a coffee shop, and in 2008, conservative Egyptians criticized emo fashion-followers in Cairo for being "disciples of Satan and homosexuals." Homosexuality is not illegal in Iraq but it is taboo, and many LGBT (lesbian/gay/bisexual/transgender) people in Iraq are discriminated against, abused or murdered. Activists say anti-gay harassment has increased since the invasion of Iraq and subsequent Iraq War, with gay Iraqis being bullied and harassed by security forces, and beaten and killed by reactionary Islamist paramilitary groups in heavily Shiite areas of Baghdad since at least 2006.

In February 2012, the Baghdad Morality Police published a statement on the Iraqi Interior Ministry website criticizing emo teens for wearing "strange, tight clothes with pictures of skulls on them," and "rings in their noses and tongues." The statement condemned emo as Satanic, and quoted Colonel Mushtaq Taleb al-Mahemdawi as saying the Morality Police had been given official approval by the Interior Ministry "to eliminate [the phenomenon] as soon as possible since it's detrimentally affecting the society and becoming a danger."  The New York Times reported that in the weeks following, anti-emo flyers threatening death "unless gay men cut their hair, stopped wearing the clothing of devil worshippers and stopped listening to metal, emo and rap music", began appearing in neighbourhoods across Baghdad.

Killings 
Interior Ministry security officers say the number of dead is six. However, the Reuters news agency reported that hospital and security officials put the number at 14 or more, and human rights groups such as the BRussells Tribunal said that the body count could be as high as 100. The Associated Press reported that an unnamed Interior Ministry official put the number at 58, and said all but one were male. According to the BBC, the United Nations puts the number of dead at at least 12, but believes the real number is much higher.

The dead were found in dumpsters, after having been beaten to death with cement blocks in a practice known as "death by blocking" or "mawt al-blokkah". A person who told the Beirut-based newspaper Al Akhbar that he had escaped an attack said that, "first they throw concrete blocks at the boy's arms, then at his legs, then the final blow is to his head, and if he is not dead then, they start all over again."

Responsibility for the murders 
International human rights groups have called on Iraqi authorities to investigate the killings, saying they are the work of paramilitary groups and the police, including groups such as the Mahdi Army, created in 2003 by popular Shia cleric Muqtada al-Sadr. Iraqi commentators and American professor of Middle Eastern history Mark Levine have speculated that deploying paramilitary groups against emo kids serves Iraqi authorities' interests by keeping the groups occupied, and deflecting their anger and unhappiness from other possible targets in chaotic post-war Iraq. Iraqi television network Al Sumaria reported that Sadr denied responsibility for the deaths, calling the emo teens fools and unnatural but saying they should be dealt with through legal means.

Following coverage of the murders, Iraqi officials denied there is any campaign to kill gay or emo teenagers, and said the story has been made up to serve anti-religious, anti-government agendas. They say emo teens can dress as they please, and that the government will protect them.

In September 2012, the BBC interviewed 17 gay men and former policemen in Baghdad, all of whom had friends or boyfriends killed, and reported that all blamed the Iraqi Interior Ministry for inciting the murders, and said arrests and killings are still ongoing.

Aftermath 
In May 2012 as a result of the emo killings, according to the International Gay and Lesbian Human Rights Commission, the Dutch government "expanded" its asylum policy towards LGBT Iraqis.

The U.S. State department's 2013 Country Reports on Human Rights Practices for Iraq reported that in 2013, Iraq's Council of Ministers established an inter-ministerial committee that issued a statement saying LGBT people are "no different" from others, and that established a charter to describe the baseline protection owed to them.

Context
Israeli intelligence analyst Daniel Brode claims the murders are part of an overall shift inside the Iraqi Shiite-Arab population towards becoming "more religious, more conservative and more assertive," with the goal of consolidating its own power by creating a "fundamentalist Shiite government."

Before the 2003 U.S. invasion of Iraq, sexual minorities there enjoyed a fair amount of freedom. But the invasion brought to power the conservative Islamic Dawa Party and Human Rights Watch says that since 2004, hundreds of Iraqi gay men have been killed. The campaign has been said to be led by the Mahdi Army, with Iraqi security forces said to have "colluded and joined in the killing." Witnesses told Human Rights Watch the killers break into houses and pick up people in the street, interrogating them to extract the names of other victims, and then kill them and mutilate their bodies.

By 2007, according to the London-based human rights organization Iraqi LGBT, Iraqi political and religious organizations had launched an organised, coordinated campaign to hunt, arrest, torture and kill everyone they perceived as gay. Iraqi LGBT says the Iraqi government forces gay people to give names and addresses of other gays, then arrests them and hands them over to paramilitary groups to be murdered.

In The Guardian newspaper, American human rights activist Scott Long described Iraq as "a devastated society with a broken political process and a fractured public" and said "it's not just wrong, it's counterproductive to call these murders "gay killings."" He called on Iraq to begin a debate about difference, saying "Iraqis need to discuss why the horrors of the last four decades have made otherness seem intolerable."

See also
 Discrimination
 LGBT activism in Iraq
 LGBT history in Iraq
 LGBT rights in Iraq
 Murder of Doski Azad
 Subculture
 Violence against LGBT people

References

2012 in Iraq
Emo
Violence against LGBT people
LGBT history in Iraq
LGBT rights in Iraq
Mass murder in 2012
Violence against men in Asia
2010s in Baghdad
2012 in LGBT history
Adolescence in Asia
Discrimination in Iraq
Incidents of violence against boys
Assassinations in Iraq